50th Anniversary Stadium of Khon Kaen University is a multi-purpose stadium in Khon Kaen Province, Thailand.  It is currently used mostly for football matches. The stadium holds 8,000 people.

Football venues in Thailand
Multi-purpose stadiums in Thailand
Buildings and structures in Khon Kaen province
Sport in Khon Kaen province
Golden jubilees